The Shadow of the Tower is a historical drama that was broadcast on BBC2 in 1972. It was a prequel to the earlier serials The Six Wives of Henry VIII and Elizabeth R and featured several actors who had appeared in them (but in new roles). Consisting of thirteen episodes, it focused on the reign of Henry VII of England and the creation of the Tudor dynasty.

Cast

Episodes

References

External links

1972 British television series debuts
1972 British television series endings
1970s British drama television series
BBC television royalty dramas
British television miniseries
Television set in Tudor England
Prequel television series
Henry VII of England
House of Tudor
English-language television shows
Television series set in the 15th century
Television series set in the 16th century